Elsa Elizabeth Monterroso (born 13 December 1971) is a Guatemalan former long-distance runner who competed over distances from 1500 metres up to the half marathon. She was active in the 1990s and 2000s. She represented her country at the 2003 Pan American Games and was twice a finalist. She competed twice at world level, at the 2000 IAAF World Half Marathon Championships and the 2004 IAAF World Cross Country Championships.

She was highly successful at competitions in the Central American region. She took a three golds and broke three Games records at the 2001 Central American Games and was a seven-time winner at the Central American Championships in Athletics. She was also a bronze medallist at the 2007 NACAC Championships in Athletics and a five-time bronze medallist at the Central American and Caribbean Championships in Athletics.

Monterroso holds the Guatemalan national records in the 3000 metres, 5000 metres and 10,000 metres.

Personal bests
1500 metres – 4:34.55 min (2001)
3000 metres – 9:42.33 min (1994) 
5000 metres – 17:03.41 min (2002) 
10,000 metres – 35:54.46 min (2003) 
Half marathon – 78:59 min (2003)

International competitions

References

External links

Living people
1971 births
Guatemalan female long-distance runners
Pan American Games competitors for Guatemala
Athletes (track and field) at the 2003 Pan American Games
Central American Games gold medalists for Guatemala
Central American Games medalists in athletics
Central American Games silver medalists for Guatemala
Central American Games bronze medalists for Guatemala
Competitors at the 2002 Central American and Caribbean Games